Urban Rez is a 2013 American documentary film about the repercussions of the Urban Relocation Program (1952–1973), the greatest voluntary upheaval of Native Americans during the 20th century. It was directed by Larry T. Pourier and written by Lisa D. Olken.

The film examines policies that encouraged Native Americans to relocate. The documentary focuses on Native Americans in rural areas. The film uses personal stories and modern-day analysis to reflect on the Voluntary Relocation Program.

The documentary was released on PBS.

Reception 
The film won the 2013 Heartland Emmy Award for Best Cultural Documentary, was an Official Selection to the 2013 Native American Indian & Video Festival of the Southeast, and was the Best Documentary Short Winner at the 2013 American Indian Festival.

In addition, the film screened at the 2014 First Nations Film and Video Festival.

See also 
Indian Relocation Act of 1956

References

External links

American Public Television listing

American documentary films
2013 television films
2013 films
2013 documentary films
Documentary films about United States history
2010s American films